Víctor Israel born José María Soler Vilanova (13 June 1929 – 19 September 2009) was a Spanish film actor. He appeared in more than 140 films, beginning in 1961. He died on 19 September 2009 aged 80 in Barcelona.

Selected filmography

 Savage Guns (1961)
 The Lovely Lola (1962)
 Circus World (1964)
 Train d'enfer (1965)
 The Good, the Bad and the Ugly (1966)
 Seven Guns for the MacGregors (1966)
 Yankee (1966)
 White Comanche (1968)
 The House That Screamed (1969)
 Cry Chicago (1969)
 Long Live the Bride and Groom (1970)
 Catlow (1971)
 The Light at the Edge of the World (1971)
 His Name Was Holy Ghost (1972)
 Horror Express (1972)
 The Witches Mountain (1972)
 Ricco the Mean Machine (1973) 
 Even Angels Eat Beans (1973)
 The Girl from the Red Cabaret (1973)
 The Marriage Revolution (1974)
 What Changed Charley Farthing? (1974)
 The Werewolf and the Yeti (1975)
 From Hong Kong with Love (1975)
 Hell of the Living Dead (1980)

References

External links

1929 births
2009 deaths
Spanish male film actors
Male Spaghetti Western actors
Male film actors from Catalonia